Cure All is an album by keyboardist Robert Walter. The recording features James Singleton (bass) and Johnny Vidacovich (drums). AllMusic states that Cure All is soul-jazz with "a healthy balance of intellect and funkiness". All About Jazz states Cure All's "simplicity is refreshing rather than predictable" and that Walter's sidemen for the album are known for their appreciation for the spirit of New Orleans.

Track listing 
"Snakes and Spiders" - 4:31
"Money Changes" - 3:11
"Cure All" - 3:26
"Coupe" - 3:31
"Scores of Spores" - 4:07
"Parts and Holes" - 5:36
"Rivers of Babylon" - 3:23
"Maple Plank" - 4:16
"Box of Glass" - 2:23
"Measure Up" - 3:25
"Hillary Street" - 4:16
"Bulldog Run" - 5:26
"T" - 3:40

Personnel
Robert Walter - Hammond organ, Fender Rhodes, piano, clavinet, percussion
James Singleton - double bass
Johnny Vidacovich - drums, cymbals

References

2008 albums
Robert Walter (musician) albums